This is a complete listing of National Basketball Association players who have scored 60 or more points in a regular season game.

This feat has been accomplished 82 times in NBA history. 34 players have scored 60 or more points in a game, while just eight players have joined the 70-point club. Only six players have scored 60 or more points on more than one occasion: Wilt Chamberlain (32 times), Kobe Bryant (6 times), Damian Lillard (5 times), Michael Jordan (4 times), James Harden (4 times), and Elgin Baylor (3 times). Chamberlain holds the single-game scoring record, having scored 100 points in a game in 1962. The youngest player to score at least 60 points in a regular season game is Devin Booker (70 points; 20 years and 145 days), and the oldest is Bryant (60 points; 37 years and 234 days).

Single-game leaders

See also
NBA regular season records
List of National Basketball Association single-game playoff scoring leaders
List of NCAA Division I men's basketball players with 60 or more points in a game
List of basketball players who have scored 100 points in a single game

Notes

 Chamberlain set the following, still-standing (as of the 2022–23 season) single-game NBA records: points scored (100), points scored in a half (59), shots made (36), shots attempted (63), and free throws made (28). Also set a then-record for points scored in a quarter (31). Last game in a streak in which Chamberlain scored 60 points or more in four straight games. The game, which wasn't televised, was played at Hershey Sports Arena in Hershey, Pennsylvania.
 Outscored the Raptors 55–41 in the second half. Led Lakers from an 18-point deficit. Bryant was in the middle of a free throw scoring streak which came to an end at 62. Scored 28 of the Lakers' 31 points in the fourth quarter. Scored 19 consecutive Laker points between the end of the first half and the middle of the third quarter.
 3 OT; set a then-record for points in a game. Most points scored in a losing effort. Also recorded 43 rebounds.
 Set a then-record for points in a regulation game.
 Most points scored in an opposing arena.
 Last game of the season; George Gervin scored 63 on the same night to win the scoring title by a .07 margin.
 Set a then-record for points in a game.
 Last game of regular season to win a scoring title over Shaquille O'Neal.
 Youngest player to score at least 60 points in a game.
 8 points in overtime. OT victory; also recorded his regular season career-high for rebounds in this game with 18.
 Last time Chamberlain scored 60. 
 Scored basket that sent game in OT. Scored nine in extra period.
 Set a then-record for points in a game.
 Scored 7 points in OT.
 Pre-shot clock era; set a then-record for points in a game.
 3 OT.
 Scored a then-record 33 points in the second quarter. Lost game but won the scoring title on last game of the season over David Thompson.
 OT; Game played at Detroit, Michigan.
 OT; Game played at Utica, New York.
 Sat out the fourth quarter; outscored Dallas alone through three quarters, 62–61.
 Anthony made a half-court buzzer-beater at the end of the first half.
 2 OT; Mikan scored 67% of his team's points.
 Scored four points in OT.
 Part of a streak in which Jordan scored 50 or more points in three consecutive games to become the only player besides Wilt Chamberlain with a 3,000-point season.
 On his 28th birthday.
 Made his first 8 three-pointers.
 Chamberlain's seventh straight 50+ point game (an NBA record) and 13th straight 40+ point game (he would push this streak to 14 the next evening). Game played at Hershey Sports Arena in Hershey, Pennsylvania.
 Game played at Cleveland, Ohio.
 Scored last basket at the buzzer. Game played at Lakefront Arena in New Orleans, Louisiana.
 Scored 16 of his team's 21 points in OT, setting an NBA record.
 3rd game of a four-game 50+ streak; Bryant's 50+ streak exceeded only by Chamberlain's streaks of seven (twice), six, and five (four times).
 Final game of Bryant's career. Oldest player to score 60.
 Sat out the fourth quarter.
 Also had 10 rebounds and 11 assists, setting the record for highest-scoring triple-double in NBA history.
 Scored two points in OT.
 Sat out the fourth quarter.
 Scored ten points in OT.
 Scored seven points in OT; also had 21 rebounds and 10 assists, tying the record for highest-scoring triple-double in NBA history.
 Scored 13 points in OT.

References

External links
Top single-game scorers (60-plus) at National Basketball Association
NBA Almanac: Most Points
Historical NBA Box Scores
Wilt Chamberlain Career Retrospective
Harvey Pollack's Statistical Yearbook

Points